Ethiopost is the national postal service of Ethiopia.

Objective 
The purpose of the Ethiopost is to allow a portal for mail acceptance, transfer deliveries and other postal services for its customers. The act of allowing these services to take place initially started as a need for the Ethiopian people to communicate on a nationwide scale. Ethiopost was created by Law with the view to establish and promote Postal Services based on the development.

Audience 
 The general public
 Embassies & consulates
 International organizations

Reform Activities 
Ethiopost has been implementing various reform activities aimed at modernizing processes, optimizing its operations, and providing customers with reliable, effective and affordable service. The reform activities entailed restructuring the institutional setup, minimizing cost and diversifying services. In collaboration with the Universal Postal Union, Ethiopost is working to leverage its extensive experience in the mail and logistics sector to support e-commerce initiatives in Ethiopia. Ethiopost strives to become a continental leader in postal service and meaningfully contribute to the sustainable development of the country.

Rebranding 
As part of the reform process, the name of the organization has been changed from 'Ethiopian Postal Service Enterprise' to 'Ethiopost' in 2019.

External links 
Official website
Ethio Postal Service
How to mail to Ethiopia
General Information about Ethiopian Postal Service History

Companies of Ethiopia
Postal organizations
Philately of Ethiopia
Communications in Ethiopia